Palaya Appaneri (Tamil;பழைய அப்பனேரி) is a small village located in the Thoothukudi district in the Indian state of Tamil Nadu.

Geography 
Kovilpatti is the closest town to Palaya Appaneri village. Palaya Appaneri is easily accessible by bus from Kovilpatti and Elayirampannai.

Palaya Appaneri village is the seat of the Thoothukudi district Panchayat. Palaya Appaneri village is also the Panchayat for Palaya Appaneri or Old Appaneri, Puthu Appaneri or New Appaneri, Puthur (lakshimiyaapuram), Suba Nagar and the area surrounding Suba Nagar,Venkateshwara Nagar and Padmavathi Garden.

Palaya Appaneri village was once part of the Thirunelveli district but is now part of Thoothukudi district.

Palaya Appaneri was the one of village of Sankarankovil tehsil but now kovilpatti is the tehsil for palaya appaneri village.

Economy 
The village has a large amount of land suitable for agriculture, but much of this land was converted to other uses. Palaya Appaneri is considered to be a developing village because of its proximity to the Kovilaptti urban center.

Many people living in the area are involved in seasonal agriculture. However, increasing urbanization and slight rainfall have led many farmers to abandon agriculture.

Representatives

President

Palaya appaneri is a Panchayat.Officially, it is referred to Appaneri panchayat.the Panchayat is including the following areas Palaya Appaneri or Old Appaneri, Puthu Appaneri or New Appaneri, Puthur (lakshimiyaapuram), Suba Nagar and the area surrounding Suba Nagar,Venkateshwara Nagar and Padmavathi Garden 
.

List of Members

Legislative assembly constituency

The Sankarankoil (state assembly constituency) is the legislative assembly constituency for palaya Appaneri or Old Appaneri village.

List of MLA'S

Parliamentary Constituency

Tenkasi (Lok Sabha constituency) is the parliamentary constituency for Palaya Appaneri or Old Appaneri.

List of MP'S

Transport
Buses are available for every 30 minutes.
Government buses
Thirumurugan mini bus 
KKS bus
K.R. Jayalakshmi bus

Temples
Vinayagar (Ganesha) temples (4)
Kaliamman temple
Chelleyaramman temple
Bambelamman temple
Irulappaswamy temples (2)
Varatharaja perumal temple
Maadaswamy temple
Veera vaiyammal temple

Festival
The annual festival is celebrated in the Kaliamman temple. It is usually conducted at the end of May or at the beginning of June in Irulappaswamy.

References

Villages in Thoothukudi district